Energy flow may refer to:
Energy transfer, the transfer of physical energy from one body or place to another
Energy flow (ecology), the flow of energy through a biological food chain
Energy (esotericism) flow, the movement of spiritual energy
Fluid dynamics, energy of a flowing fluid related to pressure
"Energy Flow", a 1999 song by Ryuichi Sakamoto

See also 
 Ecological energetics